My Greatest Songs is a R&B album by singer Etta James, released on MCA in 1992.

Track listing
 "Something's Got a Hold on Me" (Etta James, Leroy Kirkland, Pearl Woods)
 "Sunday Kind of Love" (Anita Leonard, Barbara Belle, Louis Prima, Stan Rhodes)
 "Pushover" (Billy Davis, Tony Clarke)
 "Miss Pitiful" (Otis Redding, Steve Cropper)
 "Trust in Me" (Jean Schwartz, Milton Ager, Ned Wever)
 "Spoonful" (Willie Dixon) (Duet with Harvey Fuqua)
 "Tell Mama" (Clarence Carter, Marcus Daniel, Wilbur Terrell)
 "At Last" (Harry Warren, Mack Gordon)
 "Payback" (Billy Davis)
 "Security" (Margaret Wessen, Otis Redding)
 "I'd Rather Go Blind" (Billy Foster, Ellington Jordan)
 "I Just Want to Make Love to You" (Willie Dixon)
 "Stop the Wedding" (Freddy Johnson, Leroy Kirkland, Pearl Woods)
 "Two Sides (To Every Story)" (Robert West, Willie Schofield, Wilson Pickett)
 "I Found Love" (Curtis Mayfield)
 "It's All Right"

1992 compilation albums
Etta James albums
MCA Records compilation albums